Qezelabad or Qazalabad may refer to:

Qezelabad, East Azerbaijan
Qezelabad, Famenin, Hamadan Province
Qezelabad, Qom